Proto-Afroasiatic, sometimes also referred to as Proto-Afrasian, is the reconstructed proto-language from which all modern Afroasiatic languages are descended. Though estimations vary widely, it is believed by scholars to have been spoken as a single language around 12,000 to 18,000 years ago (12 to 18 kya), that is, between 16,000 and 10,000 BC. The reconstruction of Proto-Afroasiatic is problematic and remains largely lacking. Moreover, no consensus exists as to the location of the Afroasiatic Urheimat, the putative homeland of Proto-Afroasiatic speakers, but the majority of scholars agree that it was located within a region of Northeast Africa.

Urheimat

Phonology 
The consonants of Proto-Afroasiatic, as given by Bomhard (2008):

NOTE:
Orël–Stolbova (1995) reconstructs /t͡ʃ’/, /t͡ʃ/, /d͡ʒ/ for /tʲ’/, /tʲ/, /dʲ/, respectively,
Orël–Stolbova (1995) doesn't reconstruct labialized consonants.
Bomhard (2008) lists ten vowels for the language: /i/, /iː/, /e/, /eː/, /a/, /aː/, /o/, /oː/, /u/, /uː/.

Consonant correspondences
The following table shows consonant correspondences in Afroasiatic languages, as given in Dolgopolsky (1999), along with some reconstructed consonants for Proto-Afroasiatic.

 under special conditions 

NOTE:
 = 
Symbols with dots underneath are emphatic consonants (variously glottalized, ejective or pharyngealized).
Transcription of Ancient Egyptian follows Allen (2000); see Transliteration of Ancient Egyptian.  The following are possible values for the non-IPA symbols used for Ancient Egyptian:  = ;  = ;  = , or ejective .

Pronouns 
 reconstructs the following pronouns, most of which are supported by at least five of the six branches:

Numerals 
 reconstructs the following cardinal numbers (Ehret does not include Berber in his reconstruction):

The first root for "two" has been compared to Berber (Tamazight) . There are other proposed cognate sets:

"six": Egyptian , Proto-Semitic , Berber (Tamazight) .
"seven": Egyptian , Proto-Semitic , Berber (Tamazight) .

Grammar
It has been proposed that Proto-Afroasiatic had marked nominative case marking, where the subject was overtly marked for nominative case, while the object appeared in unmarked default case. Marked nominative case marking is still found in languages of the Cushitic, Omotic and Berber branches. Its syntax possibly featured an exclusively default, strict word ordering of VSO. Although some Afroasiatic languages have developed free word order, it is generally surmised that PAA was originally a VO language.

See also 
Afroasiatic phonetic notation
Proto-Afroasiatic reconstructions (Wiktionary)

References

Bibliography 

 

Afro-Asiatic
Afroasiatic languages